This is an overview of the progression of the Paralympic track cycling record of the men's flying 200 m time trial as recognised by the Union Cycliste Internationale (UCI) and IPC.

B Progression

References

Track cycling Olympic record progressions